Debasis Chakroborty (born 9 June 1961) is an Indian classical slide guitar player from Senia-Maihar Gharana.

Chakroborty was born in Calcutta, India, and began learning guitar from his father Sh. Madhusudan Chakroborty. He then came under the tutelage of guitarist Pandit Barun Kumar Pal from Kolkata, and Pandit Jotin Bhattacharya, a sarod player and senior disciple of Ustad Baba Allauddin Khan Sahib of Maihar Gharana. Later on, Debasis became a disciple of the guitarist Pundit Brij Bhushan Kabra.

Debasis's style of playing combines both Gayaki and Tantrakari Angs. He follows the oldest tradition of playing sarode, sitar and veena with his modified Hawaiian guitar, which has a three-octave range.

He is an "A" grade artiste of Prasar Bharati in both Hindustani Classical and light music, and performed in the National programme. He is an ICCR empanelled artiste under the Indian Ministry of External Affairs. He has performed at Monash University in Melbourne, Australia as visiting faculty and artist in residence. At present, he lectures in the Department of Music, Institute of Visual Performing Arts & Research, Mangalayatan University in Aligarh.

Discography
2012 – " Soul Mate" ecstasy on Slide Guitar, Label: Mountains Meet the Sea Productions-Australia,India,Switzerland
Solo with Sam Evans (Tabla)
2008 – Charukeshi, with Robert Burke, Stephen Magnusson, Sam Evans 
Associated Works
2008 – Creatures at the Crossroads, with Gian Slater
2010 – Tumbling into the Dawn, with Lior

References

External links
 
 

1961 births
Living people
Hindustani instrumentalists
Indian guitarists
Musicians from Kolkata
Slide guitarists